Tikmeh Kord (also Romanized as Tīkmeh Kord; also known as Tekmeh Kord, Tīkmeh, Tīkmeh Kharābeh, Tīkmeh-ye Bālā, Tikme Qishlāq, and Tokmeh) is a village in Chaybasar-e Jonubi Rural District, in the Central District of Maku County, West Azerbaijan Province, Iran. At the 2006 census, its population was 298, in 51 families.

References 

Populated places in Maku County